James Forward Bond (1785–1829) was an Irish Anglican priest in the first half of the  19th-century.

Bond was the son of Wensley Bond, Dean of Ross, Ireland from 1772 to 1813. He was born in County Sligo and educated at Trinity College, Dublin He was Dean of Ross, Ireland  from 1813 until his death.

References

Alumni of Trinity College Dublin
Deans of Ross, Ireland
1829 deaths
1785 births
Clergy from County Sligo